River Cafe is a restaurant on Isla Cuale in Zona Romántica, Puerto Vallarta, in the Mexican state of Jalisco.

Description
The restaurant, described as one of the city's most popular, is located on Isla Cuale and overlooks the Cuale River. The menu includes international and Mexican comfort food; international options include fried calamari, seafood fettuccine, vegetarian crepes, and wild-mushroom soup, and Mexican options include nachos, quesadillas, seared tuna, and guacamole and salsas. According to Fodor's, "At night, candles flicker at white-skirted tables with comfortable cushioned chairs, and tiny white lights sparkle in palm trees surrounding the multilevel terrace." The restaurant hosts live jazz on Friday and Saturday evenings.

History
Owned by Eva Sanchez and Margarito Larios, the restaurant was established in 1996. Willie & Lobo have performed at River Cafe.

Reception
Fodor's recommends the restaurant for breakfast as well as the "evening ambience". Alex Robinson included the River Cafe in The Culture Trip's 2021 list of the city's top restaurants.

See also

 List of Mexican restaurants
 List of restaurants in Mexico

References

External links

 

1996 establishments in Mexico
Mexican restaurants in Mexico
Restaurants established in 1996
Restaurants in Jalisco
Zona Romántica